Leopold von Pebal (29 December 1826 – 17 February 1887) was an Austrian chemist.

In 1851 he obtained his PhD at the University of Graz, followed by several years working as an assistant at the Joanneum. In 1855 he became a privat-docent of theoretical chemistry. Afterwards, he continued his education at Heidelberg, where he studied with Robert Bunsen (1811-1899) and Gustav Robert Kirchhoff (1824-1887). From 1857 onward, he worked as an associate professor at the University of Lemberg. 

Pebal remained a professor at Lemberg until 1865, after which, he became a professor at the University of Graz. He planned the new chemistry laboratory in Graz, which was finished in 1878. Adolph Wurtz (1817-1884) was sent by the French government to report about the laboratory. The possibility that the institute would be divided into two independent institutes troubled Pebal, but with the help of colleagues the problems were resolved. Pebal was murdered by an employee of the university in front of his laboratory, where he died shortly after the attack.

His wide-ranging research included studies involving the composition of stearic and citric acid.

References 
 

19th-century Austrian people
19th-century chemists
Austrian chemists
Austrian untitled nobility
Austrian murder victims
People murdered in Austria
1826 births
1887 deaths
Academic staff of the University of Lviv
Academic staff of the University of Graz
University of Graz alumni
1887 murders in Europe